Joseph Kelly may refer to:

Politics
Joseph D. Kelly (New York City) (1887–1953), New York politician and judge
Joseph J. Kelly (1897–1963), mayor of Buffalo, New York from 1942 to 1945
Joseph L. Kelly (1867–1925), Virginia judge and politician
Joe Kelly (attorney) (born 1956), American attorney and Nebraska Lieutenant Governor
Joseph P. Kelly (New York politician) (1894–1968), New York politician
Joseph Kelly (New South Wales politician) (1855–1931), Australian politician
Joe Kelly (Queensland politician) (Joseph Patrick Kelly)

Other
Joseph Kelly (crimper) (died 1900s), Portland crimper
Joseph D. Kelly (sound engineer), American sound engineer
Joseph Anthony Kelly (born 1958), Catholic writer, editor and publisher
Joseph Patrick Kelly (born 1962), professor of English

See also
Joe Kelly (disambiguation)
Joe Kelley, American baseball player